Rezvanshahr may refer to:

 Rezvanshahr, Gilan, a city in Gilan Province, Iran
 Rezvanshahr, Isfahan, a city in Isfahan Province, Iran
 Rezvanshahr, Yazd, in Yazd Province, Iran
 Rezvanshahr County, an administrative subdivision in Gīlan Province, Iran